The Lamkhaga Pass (5,282 m / 17,320 ft) is one of the toughest pass which connects Kinnaur district of Himachal Pradesh with Harshil in Uttarakhand. Harsil-Kharcham Highway will have a Lamkhaga Pass tunnel, and the highway route will also connect to Char Dham Highway and Pooh-Chumar-Hanle Highway.

History

This trek is a fairly remote trek, which was first crossed by Greek-British author and mountaineer Marco Alexander Pallis in 1933. Pallis was a Greek-British author and mountaineer who was famous for his writings on Tibetan Buddhism. He made a first ascent of Leo Pargial(6790m) in 1933.

Trekking

The Lamkhaga Pass trek starts from Chitkul the last Village of Sangla valley in Himachal, though it can be done from Harshil side in Uttarakhand also. This pass is located near Indo - Tibetan border and to cross the pass one needs to obtain inner line permit from the district administration of Kinnaur, Himachal Pradesh

See also 

 India-China Border Roads
 List of mountain passes of India

References

Mountain passes of Himachal Pradesh
Mountain passes of Uttarakhand